Figuier (French for "fig tree") is a French surname. Notable people with the surname include:

Louis Figuier (1819–1894), French scientist and writer
Romuald Figuier (born 1941), French singer

See also 
Gouais blanc
Figuier's imaginary telectroscope
Arboretum du Figuier, an experimental arboretum of fig trees located in Nézignan-l'Évêque, Hérault, Languedoc-Roussillon

French-language surnames